James Montgomery Beck (July 9, 1861 – April 12, 1936) was an American lawyer, politician, and author from Philadelphia, Pennsylvania. He was a member of the Republican Party, who served as U.S. Solicitor General and U.S. Representative from Pennsylvania.

Early life 
Beck was born July 9, 1861 in Philadelphia, Pennsylvania, the son of Margaretta C. (née Darling) and James Nathan Beck. He graduated from Moravian College in Bethlehem, Pennsylvania in 1880. He was employed as clerk for a railway company in 1880 and studied law at night, was admitted to the bar in 1884 and commenced practice in Philadelphia. He was admitted to the bar of New York City in 1903, and to the bar of England in 1922.

Career 
Beck served as assistant United States attorney for the eastern district of Pennsylvania from 1888 to 1892 and as United States attorney in Philadelphia from 1896 to 1900. In 1898, he ran for District Attorney of Philadelphia, but lost to P. Frederick Rothermel.  He was appointed by President William McKinley as assistant to the Attorney General of the United States in 1900 and served until his resignation in 1903.  He returned to the full-time practice of law, joining the firm of Shearman & Sterling in New York City. In 1917, he left that firm to become senior partner in Beck, Crawford & Harris, and retired from active practice in 1927 to run for Congress from Philadelphia.

At the outbreak of World War I, he took a strong stand against Germany and wrote much and delivered many addresses to show Germany's responsibility.
He was elected a bencher of Gray's Inn in 1914, being the first foreigner in 600 years to receive that distinction.  He also received decorations from France and Belgium and authored several books and articles on the First World War and on the Constitution of the United States.  Among his works were The Evidence in the Case (1914) and War and Humanity (1916).

Solicitor General 
He was appointed by President Warren G. Harding as Solicitor General of the United States in 1921 and served until his voluntary resignation in 1925, when he again resumed the practice of law. During his term as solicitor general, he had charge of more than 800 cases before the U.S. Supreme Court. He personally and successfully argued more than 100 of those cases, including Ozawa v. United States. The remainder were detailed to staff.

His conservative views were reflected in his 1924 book The Constitution of the United States. It was a best-seller, going through seven printings within ten months. A special edition of 10,000 copies, with a foreword by President-elect Calvin Coolidge, went to schools and libraries across the country.

U.S. Representative 
After resigning as solicitor general, Beck became involved in the legal fight of William S. Vare, who had been elected to the U.S. Senate but was denied a seat because of irregularities in the election. In response, Beck wrote The Vanishing Rights of States in which he argued that the U.S. Constitution did not allow the Senate the ability to exclude a member chosen through an election. The debate that followed the book's publishing raised Beck's public profile and made him a prominent option to fill the House seat vacated by the resignation of James M. Hazlett.

Beck was elected as a Republican to the Seventieth Congress, was reelected to the Seventy-first, Seventy-second, and Seventy-third Congresses and served from November 8, 1927 until his resignation on September 30, 1934.

He was active in the movement to repeal the Eighteenth Amendment, which he said had no place in the constitution. He also fended off legal questions about his official residence and thus eligibility to represent Philadelphia.

Later legal battles 
Beck resigned his seat in the House of Representatives because of strong objections to President Franklin Roosevelt's New Deal. In a statement released at the time of his resignation, he stated that Congress had become "merely a rubber stamp for the Executive."

He joined the lawsuit against the New Deal-created Tennessee Valley Authority and argued the case in the Supreme Court in December 1935, declaring the organization unconstitutional and Socialistic. In the final weeks before his death, he served as counsel in the case of an oil stock dealer accused of violating the Securities Act of 1933.

Personal life 
Beck was married to Lilla Lawrence Mitchell (1861–1956), the daughter of James and Emeline Lawrence Mitchell of Philadelphia and, later, Baltimore, Maryland. Together, they were the parents of two children:

 James Montgomery Beck Jr. (1892–1972) who married The Hon. Clarissa "Clare" Tennant (1896–1960), a daughter of Edward Tennant, 1st Baron Glenconner and the former Pamela Wyndham. After their divorce, he married Mary Ridgely Carter.
 Beatrice Beck (1897–1980), who married foreign service officer Somerville Pinkney Tuck in 1924. After their 1934 divorce, she married Snowden Andrews Fahnestock (a grandson of banker Harris C. Fahnestock), in 1936.

Beck died April 12, 1936 in Washington, D.C., and is buried at Rock Creek Cemetery. His widow died on August 1, 1956.

References

External links 

James M. Beck Papers at the Seeley G. Mudd Manuscript Library, Princeton University
 
 
 

1861 births
1936 deaths
Moravian University alumni
United States Solicitors General
United States Attorneys for the Eastern District of Pennsylvania
Republican Party members of the United States House of Representatives from Pennsylvania
Lawyers from New York City
Lawyers from Philadelphia
Burials at Rock Creek Cemetery